Dark Planet may refer to:

 Dark Planet (novel), a 2007 novel based on the television series Doctor Who
 Dark Planet (film), a 2008 Russian science fiction film
 The Dark Planet (film), a 1989 American film co-written and co-directed by Richard Corben and Christopher Wheate

See also
 Carbon planet, a theoretical type of planet that contains more carbon than oxygen